Young Tarang is the third studio album by the Pakistani pop duo Nazia and Zoheb, consisting of Nazia Hassan and Zoheb Hassan. The music was composed by Zoheb and British-Indian producer Biddu, with lyrics written by Nazia and Zoheb.

It was first released in Pakistan in 1983, then worldwide in 1984, and went on to sell over 40 million copies. It is one of the most famous albums of Asia. It was also the first South Asian album to feature music videos.

Music video 
Amit Khanna directed "Zara Chera Tu Dekhao", "Sunn" and "Dosti". He used three cameras to shoot the videos. After this the team went to London and recorded four videos with the famous set designer and director, John King, who was also the set designer of Michael Jackson's "Thriller". Amit and John worked on "Pyar Ka Jadu", "Dum Dum Dede", "Ankhien Milane Wale" and "Aag".

Reception 
In 1983, EMI awarded it a Platinum disc for exceeding 150,000 cassette sales in Pakistan. The album went on to become a success in India, and in South East Asia, where it was awarded a Double Platinum Disc. The Hong Kong magazine Asiaweek reported that the album sold 100,000 cassettes in its first three weeks, with demand remaining consistent afterwards. The album went on to sell over 40 million copies worldwide.

Over thirty years later, an India Today article titled "Nazia makes a lovely comeback" celebrated Nazia Hassan's music appearing in the cult 2012 film, Miss Lovely that had premiered at the Cannes Film Festival: "The film has made the audience nostalgic over Ahluwalia's use of the song "Dum dum de de" from Hassan's 1984 album, Young Tarang." Miss Lovely director, Ashim Ahluwalia, described keeping the original track untouched: "The song symbolises the '80s and the lyrics of the song were in sync with the mood of the film. [We] retained the original voice of Nazia. We didn't want to remix this song because the original was perfect."

Songs 
 Aag - Nazia Hassan
 Dum Dum Dede - Nazia Hassan
 Chehra - Zoheb Hassan
 Kya Howa - Nazia Hassan
 Dosti - Nazia Hassan & Zoheb Hassan
 Ashanti - Zoheb Hassan
 Sunn - Nazia Hassan
 Medley - Instrumental
 Ankhien Milane Wale - Nazia Hassan
 Pyar Ka Jadu - Zoheb Hassan

Music by 
Zohaib Hassan
Biddu

Lyrics by 
Nazia Hassan
Zoheb Hassan
Sehba Akhtar
Amit Khanna

References 

Urdu-language albums
1983 albums
1984 albums
Nazia and Zoheb albums
Disco albums
Nazia Hassan albums